Stormy Bird (Romanian: Pasărea furtunii) is a 1957 Romanian drama film directed by Dinu Negreanu. The film portrays the lives of Black Sea fisherman during the Second World War and then in the years following the Communist takeover.

Cast
 Mircea Albulescu as Adam Jora
 Marcel Anghelescu 
 Costache Antoniu 
 Ștefan Ciubotărașu as Dobre
  
 Fory Etterle 
 Margareta Pogonat as Uliana
 Paul Sava
  as Simion

References

Bibliography 
 Liehm, Mira & Liehm, Antonín J. The Most Important Art: Eastern European Film After 1945. University of California Press, 1977.

External links 
 

1957 drama films
1957 films
Romanian drama films
1950s Romanian-language films
Films directed by Dinu Negreanu
Romanian black-and-white films
Eastern Front of World War II films
Romanian World War II films